Oh, My Dear! was a Broadway musical comedy in two acts with book and lyrics by Guy Bolton and P. G. Wodehouse, and music by Louis A. Hirsch. The play was produced by William Elliott and F. Ray Comstock and opened under the direction of Robert Milton and Edward Royce at the Princess Theatre on West 39th Street in New York City on November 27, 1918. Oh, My Dear! had a run of 189 performances, with the final curtain falling on May 10, 1919.

Reviews
Music Trades, December 5, 1918:

Like its musical comedy predecessors at the Princess Theatre, "Oh, My Dear!" is tastefully costumed, daintily mounted, and calculated to appeal to a large percentage of the public which made the previous O-perettas so popular.

The basis of its comedy, aside from an occasional well-turned phrase, is the familiar theory that there is nothing so funny as a married man, unless it be two of them. It was to preserve domestic peace that the proprietor of a health resort was obliged to introduce the impeccable Joseph Santley as a young man with a Broadway reputation—not altogether a new situation— and it was to sustain that falsehood that a number of others had to be evolved. And so grew the plot, embellished from time to time with such musical-comedy observations as "Husbands are like dollar watches— you're darned lucky to get them guaranteed for one year."

Green Book Magazine, January 1919:

During twenty-five years of theatergoing one learns that there are two kinds of musical comedies—the "low-brow" sort, and those in which the girls aren't seen for ten minutes after the curtain rises. The exclamatory school presented at the Princess runs to cleverness rather than to comeliness, but the cleverest of librettists, lyric-writers and composers grow weary and a trifle stale, and so it happens that "Oh, My Dear!" lacks some of the freshness and sparkle of "Oh, Boy!" and "Oh, Lady! Lady!!" 
Guy Bolton's book is rather more frankly than usual of the scrap variety; P. G. Wodehouse's rhymes are not so startlingly felicitous; and Louis A. Hirsch's music, though pleasant to take, has a somewhat familiar flavor.

The story concerns the stock mild-and middle - aged married man who hasn't kicked over the traces since he sneaked off "to a Burton Holmes Travelogue in 1916," and who gets himself into the stock complications by inducing someone to pass himself off as someone he isn't.

Then the wife of the someone he isn't turns up, and we come to the stock situation in which a man and a woman who have been but casually acquainted are assigned to occupy the same chamber.

This tangle is unraveled by a company including Frederic Graham, Roy Atwell, Joseph Allen, Ivy Sawyer, Joseph Santley, Georgia Caine and Juliette Day. "I Wonder Whether," "Our City of Dreams" and "You Never Know" are the best of the song numbers.
In comparison, "Oh, My Dear!" suffers chiefly by being set beside its predecessors at the Princess—it is announced as "the sixth annual New York Princess Theater musical comedy production."

Cast and crew

Musical Director: Max Hirschfeld
Additional Music: Jean Schwartz
 Songs: Jerome Kern, Benjamin Hapgood Burt and Roy Atwell
 Scenic Design: Robert Milton
 Costume Design: Harry Collins
Men's clothes: Designed by Croydon, Ltd
Joseph Allen: Bagshott 	
Roy Atwell: Broadway Willie Burbank 	
Dorothy Bailey: Miss Beekman 	
Helen Barnes: Georgie Van Alstyne 	
Marjorie Bentley: Grace Spelvin 	
Georgia Caine: Mrs. Rockett 	
Clara Carroll: Miss Lennox 	
Gene Carroll: Miss Schuyler 	
Frances Chase: Miss Stuyvesant 	
Helen Clarke: Babe 	
Miriam Collins: Pickles 	
Francis X. Conlan: Joe Plummer 	
Juliette Day: Jennie Wren 	
Evelyn Dorn: Hazel 	
Sven Erick: Neal Clarke 	
Robert Gebhardt : Harry Coppins 	
Patricia Gordon: Miss Barclay 	
Frederic Graham: Dr. Rockett 	
Dorothy La Rue: Miss Bryant 	
Alfa Lanee: Miss Audobon 	
Victor Le Roy: Willie Love 	
Rene Manning: Miss Franklin 	
Florence McGuire: Nan Hatton 	
Victoria Miles: Miss Rhinelander 	
Bessie More: Miss Cortlandt 	
Joseph Santley: Bruce Allenby 	
Ivy Sawyer:	Hilda Rockett 	
Jennifer Sinclair: Miss Greeley 	
Jacques Stone: Frank Lynn

References

External links

1918 musicals
Broadway musicals